Dalea jamesonii is a species of legume in the family Fabaceae. It is found only in Ecuador. Its natural habitat is subtropical or tropical dry shrubland.

References

jamesonii
Endemic flora of Ecuador
Vulnerable flora of South America
Taxonomy articles created by Polbot